Meysam Soleimani (born January 21, 1982) is an Iranian football defender.

Soleimani played for Foolad F.C. in the 2006 AFC Champions League group stage.

International goals

References

Iranian footballers
Association football midfielders
Foolad FC players
Sepahan S.C. footballers
1982 births
Living people
People from Ahvaz
Sportspeople from Khuzestan province